George Langley may refer to:

 George Langley (politician) (1852–1933), English-born farmer and political figure in Saskatchewan
 George Colt Langley (1810–1896), Royal Marines officer
 George Furner Langley (1891–1971), Australian soldier, educationist and headmaster
 George Harry Langley (1881–1951), English academic wand vice-chancellor of the University of Dhaka